Jerónimo Gracián or Jerome Gratian (6 June 1545 – 21 September 1614) was a Spanish Carmelite and writer.  He was the spiritual director of St Teresa of Ávila, who took a vow of obedience to him.
He was the first Provincial of the Discalced Carmelites.

References

Carmelites
Spanish Roman Catholic priests
Spanish male writers
People from Valladolid
1545 births
1614 deaths